Târgu Secuiesc is a city in Covasna County, Transylvania, Romania. It administers one village, Lunga (Nyujtód).

History 
The town was first mentioned in 1407 as Torjawasara, meaning in Hungarian “Torja Market”. (Torja is the name of a stream nearby and is also the Hungarian name of the nearby village Turia.) Originally, the Hungarian name Kézdivásárhely was also used in Romanian in the form Chezdi-Oșorheiu, but this was altered to Tîrgu Secuiesc (now spelled Târgu Secuiesc) after the accession to Romania in 1920 under the Treaty of Trianon. The Hungarian native name means “Kézdi Market”, Kézdi being the name of a Székely “seat”, a historical administrative unit. Its status as a market town dates back to the Middle Ages. The city was taken over by Hungary during World War II, following the Second Vienna Award of August, 1940. A small Jewish community was set up in the 1880s; it numbered 66 in 1920. In May 1944, the Hungarian authorities sent its members to the Sfântu Gheorghe ghetto, and deported them to the Auschwitz concentration camp the following month. Sovereignty was restored to Romania following the war.

Demographics
According to the 2011 census, the town had a population of 18,491. Of the residents for whom data were available, 91.1% were Székely Hungarians, 7.2% Romanians, and 1.6% Roma. The historical demographic evolution is as follows:

Demographic change according to census data:

Natives
 Etele Baláska
 János Balogh
 Andrei Cadar
 André de Dienes
 Róbert Elek
 Tiberiu Ghioane
 Kató Havas
 Gergely Kovács
 Béla Markó
 Roland Niczuly
 Ioan Robu
 Árpád Szántó
 Nándor Tamás
 Gábor Vajna

Education
Despite its relatively small size the town has a few notable high schools: Nagy Mózes, Bod Péter, Apor Péter and Gábor Áron, all bearing the names of important Székely historical personalities. Because of this, Târgu Secuiesc is considered the educational center of the north eastern part of the county.

Gallery

References

External links

 Official site 
 Kézdivásárhely Centrum City Map
 Official site of the Kézdivásárhely Sportclub (KSE)  
 Nagy Mózes High School
 Gábor Aron High School

Populated places in Covasna County
Cities in Romania
Localities in Transylvania